Captain Reginald Fife "Bob" Whinney DSC & Two Bars (8 February 1909 – 1992) was a Royal Navy officer who specialised in anti-submarine warfare during World War II. Whilst in command of the W-class destroyer  he helped destroy three German U-boats. For his war services he received the Distinguished Service Cross with two Bars. After the war he was promoted to captain and went on to become Chief Staff Officer Intelligence of the Mediterranean and Middle East during the Suez Crisis. In 1986 he published his memoirs of his service years in The U-Boat Peril: an anti-submarine commanders War.

Early life and education
Reginald Whinney was born in Rathdown, County Dublin, Ireland on 8 Feb 1909; his father Harold Fife Whinney was at that time a major in the Oxfordshire and Buckinghamshire Light Infantry (though he rose to lieutenant colonel).

He was first educated at Eastman's Prep School and then enlisted as an officer cadet at Dartmouth Naval College in 1922; an institution of which he was highly critical. Whilst there he met two people who were cast out of the college and went on to gain notoriety; Guy Burgess and Norman Baillie-Stewart.

Upon leaving Dartmouth, Whinney was sent to join  in Malta where (among other duties) he received lectures from Lord Louis Mountbatten. On 1 January 1927 he became a midshipman and soon after transferred to  under Captain William M. James. In 1929 Whinney passed his seamanship exam and progressed to the Royal Naval College, Greenwich, to finish his education before leaving as a sub-lieutenant.

Navy career
However, after six months of service on the gunnery training ship  his record was cleared and he gained a transfer to the heavy cruiser  taking passage to the China station.

HMS Suffolk commanded by Captain Errol Manners was soon to become the flagship of Admiral Sir Frederic Dreyer and took passage to Japan to attend the funeral of Marshal-admiral Tōgō Heihachirō. They also travelled to Bali, Borneo, Java, Celebes islands and up the Yangtze River.

Next he was given orders to return to Britain to commence anti submarine training but en route he was asked by Naval Intelligence Division to travel overland by train through Italy in order to memorise the dispositions of the Italian navy vessels in their ports.

Having passed the exam at Portland he was appointed as Assistant Anti-Submarine Officer to the 5th Destroyer Flotilla to be stationed aboard . When the Spanish Civil War broke out in July 1936 Echo led three other destroyers from the 5th DF in patrolling the north coast of Spain but they returned in November for the fleet inspection at Portland by King Edward VIII. After Edward abdicated Whinney took part in the lining of The Mall at the coronation of King George VI and Queen Elizabeth and then soon after the Fleet review at Spithead on 20 May 1937. When his appointment on Echo was finished Whinney returned as an instructor at the anti-submarine warfare school at Portland where he was given the responsibility of explaining the underwater equipment to visiting dignitaries such as Winston Churchill, the Duke of Kent, Lord Mountbatten and George VI.

Whinney then joined  as the Anti-Submarine Officer (A/S) taking passage to Shanghai where they were stationed when the coded signal arrived to "Commence hostilities against Germany". They returned to the Mediterranean for a short time before being sent back home to Britain in escort to the battleship ; on the way back, off the west coast of Ireland Barham collided with Duncans sister ship  as the convoy altered course for the Firth of Clyde.

World War II
On 17 January whilst escorting Convoy ON18 Duncan was accidentally rammed by a Norwegian merchant vessel causing a twenty-foot hole in her side but fortunately she did not sink and was taken under tow to Invergordon for temporary repairs. She was later towed to Grangemouth for repairs that were not completed until 22 July.

After another short stint at the Anti-submarine training school Whinney joined the lead ship of the 4th Destroyer flotilla  under Captain Philip Vian, with whom he had served under as a midshipman on Royal Sovereign. In May 1941 whilst they were escorting a southbound convoy WS8B from Glasgow they heard that  had been sunk by German battleship . On the evening of 26 May Piorun spotted Bismarck and opened fire; Vian kept up the attacks throughout the night, maintaining contact until the arrival of the big ships of the fleet the next day.

His next appointment was to the staff of the Commander-in-chief, South Atlantic stationed in Freetown, West Africa where he advised on Anti-submarine matters and trained the local escort force. Here he caused a slight controversy when he was sent to investigate the Cape Verde Islands by reconnaissance aircraft for signs of German U-boats being refuelled there; the islands belonged to Britain's allies Portugal and Whinney flying too close was caught snooping. He also caught malaria whilst stationed here which needed several months of treatment beginning at the Hospital for Tropical Diseases (then based in Liverpool) on his return to Britain at the end of 1942.

HMS Wanderer
Whinney assumed command of the destroyer  in April 1943 while it was being converted to a long range escort in the dockyards of Devonport. They served on the Western Approaches Command initially based at Greenock but later moving to Londonderry. Their first operational job was to escort troop ships for the Allied invasion of Sicily.

U-523 suffered 17 dead with 37 survivors.

The following day (26 August), Wanderer delivered an advance RAF party to Portugal to implement the agreement signed between Britain and Portugal for the use of airfields in the Azores from which to operate their maritime patrol aircraft.

On 17 Jan 1944 Wanderer, in concert with the frigate , sank a U-boat (identified as  but possibly ) in the North Atlantic. Whinney was concerned about the repercussions of this action, as he had disobeyed an order, and carried out an unauthorized attack, to achieve this result, but he was awarded the Distinguished Service Cross (DSC) in February 1944, and on 20 June 1944 he was awarded a Bar to the decoration.

On 5 July 1944 while supporting the Normandy Invasion, Wanderer and the British frigate  sank  in the Baie de la Seine, English Channel, with depth charges; 48 were killed with 1 survivor.   Whinney received a second Bar to his DSC for this action in October 1944.

Having landed the survivor from U-390 at Portland Whinney discovered that Wanderer was no longer sea worthy so he was reassigned to a job in the Admiralty assessing reports of Anti-submarine actions. However, having been on the job for only a few weeks Whinney fell ill with "operational fatigue" in late December and so it came as a great surprise to be promoted to commander on 31 December 1944.

Post-war
He then served ashore firstly at the Seaward defence school then in 1950 he was promoted to captain and became Deputy Director of the Underwater Weapons Department at Bath. Next he became Chief Staff Officer Intelligence, Mediterranean and Middle East where he was stationed during the Suez Crisis. Then after a short while in the Reserve Fleet he took his final posting as a naval attaché in Yugoslavia.

In retirement he worked for Cancer Relief and wrote his memoirs, The U-Boat Peril.  He married twice and had a son and two daughters from his first marriage.

Family
Wife Bridget Coote, married 30 July 1959.

Works
 The U-Boat Peril, Arrow Books, London, 1986

Footnotes

References

Sources

1909 births
1992 deaths
People from Dún Laoghaire–Rathdown
Recipients of the Distinguished Service Cross (United Kingdom)
Royal Navy officers of World War II